Jesus M. Vargas (22 March 1905 – 25 March 1994) served as Secretary of National Defense and Chief of Staff of the Armed Forces of the Philippines. In his later years, he was the Secretary-General of Southeast Asia Treaty Organization 

(SEATO) which was based in Bangkok, Thailand.

Early life
Jesus Miranda Vargas was born on March 22, 1905, in Manila to Braulio Vargas and Petrona Miranda.

He finished his Bachelor of Science at the Philippine Constabulary Academy in 1929. He also graduated from the Field Artillery School in Fort Sill, Oklahoma in 1940 and the Command and General Staff College, Fort Leavenworth, Kansas in 1947.

Career
Vargas was a World War 2 veteran. He served in the Philippine Army from 1937 to 1951. 

PC, 1930-1935; aide-de-camp to the Philippine President and Commanding Officer, President Guard Battalion, 1943; Executive Officer, Ground Force, 1947-1948; Superintendent, Manila ROTC, 1948-1949; Commander, 5th Battalion Combat Team (Huk campaign), 1949–50;
Deputy Chief of Staff, AFP 1950-1951; Vice Chief of Staff, AFP, 1951-1953; Chief of Staff, AFP, 1953-1956; military adviser, Southeast Asia Treaty Organization (SEATO), 1954-1956; retired Lieutenant General, Armed Forces of the Philippines; Secretary of National Defense, 1957-1959;

Board Chairman, National Waterworks & Sewerage Authority, 1957–59; president, Philippine American Management & Financing Company, 1961–65; Chairman of the Board of Trustees, Ramon Magsaysay Award Foundation, 1962–65; and secretary-general, SEATO, 1965-72.

Medals and awards
Gold Cross, Distinguished Service Star, Long Service medal, Military Commendation ribbon, Army Commendation ribbon, Philippine Republic Presidential citation badge, Distinguished Unit Badge. Luzon Campaign medal, Philippine Defense medal and ribbon, Philippine Liberation medal and ribbon, Anti-dissidence Campaign ribbon, American Defense Services medal and ribbon, Asiatic-Pacific War Theater Campaign medal and ribbon, World War II Victory medal and ribbon, Order of Military Merit (Taiguk), Republic of Korea; Order of the White Elephant, Thailand; and Military Merit Medal (degree of the commander).

Personal life
Vargas was married to Rosalina Morillo in 1931 and had four children. Their names are Jesus Jr., Nandy, Francisco, Teresa and Baby Vargas.

See also
Department of National Defense (Philippines)
Armed Forces of the Philippines

References

Biography of General Vargas

Chairmen of the Joint Chiefs (Philippines)
Philippine Army personnel
People from Manila
Progressive Party (Philippines) politicians
Recipients of the Gold Cross (Philippines)
Recipients of the Military Commendation Medal
Recipients of the Distinguished Service Star
Recipients of the Philippine Republic Presidential Unit Citation
Secretaries General of the Southeast Asia Treaty Organization
1905 births
1994 deaths
Secretaries of National Defense of the Philippines
Garcia administration cabinet members
Magsaysay administration personnel